This is a list of the British Academy Television Awards for Best Actress. The British Academy Television Awards began in 1955. The Best Actress award was initially given as an "individual honour", without credit to a particular performance, until 1969, when Wendy Craig won for her performance in Not in Front of the Children. Since 1970, nominees have been announced in addition to the winner, and are listed, with the winner highlighted in blue. 

Julie Walters holds the record of most wins in this category with four, followed by Judi Dench, Thora Hird and Helen Mirren, with three wins each.

Jodie Comer is the youngest actress at only 29 years old to hold 5 Best Actress nominations. With Helen Mirren and Francesca Annis having received 6 and Judi Dench and Julie Walters having received 7. Comer received her first nomination in 2017, then for four consecutive years between 2019 and 2022. Her first win came for Killing Eve in 2019. Comer’s nominations span over three different projects (Thirteen, Killing Eve and Help). Comer won in 2022 for Help , making her the youngest actress at 29, to achieve two British Academy Television Awards.

The Actress category was split into Leading Actress and Supporting Actress, starting in 2010.

Winners and nominees

1950s

1960s

1970s

1980s

1990s

2000s

2010s

2020s

Superlatives

Actresses with multiple wins and nominations

Multiple wins
The following people have been awarded the British Academy Television Award for Actress multiple times:

4 wins
Julie Walters

3 wins
Judi Dench
Thora Hird
Helen Mirren

2 wins
Peggy Ashcroft
Jodie Comer
Annette Crosbie
Catherine Lacey
Anna Maxwell Martin
Gwen Watford
Billie Whitelaw

Multiple nominations
The following people have been nominated for the British Academy Television Award for Actress multiple times:

7 nominations
Judi Dench
Julie Walters

6 nominations
Francesca Annis
Helen Mirren

5 nominations
Jodie Comer

4 nominations
Peggy Ashcroft
Geraldine James
Maggie Smith

3 nominations
Anne-Marie Duff
Lindsay Duncan
Claire Foy
Thora Hird
Glenda Jackson
Celia Johnson
Gemma Jones
Rosemary Leach
Gina McKee
Anna Maxwell Martin
Miranda Richardson
Sheridan Smith
Juliet Stevenson
Gwen Watford
Billie Whitelaw

2 nominations
Eileen Atkins
Helena Bonham-Carter
Claire Bloom
Cheryl Campbell
Annette Crosbie
Keeley Hawes
Joan Hickson
Suranne Jones
Penelope Keith
Catherine Lacey
Jane Lapotaire
Sarah Lancashire
Maxine Peake
Vicky McClure
Virginia McKenna
Samantha Morton
Kate Nelligan
Vanessa Redgrave
Alison Steadman
Dorothy Tutin
Zoe Wanamaker
Emily Watson
Ruth Wilson
Victoria Wood

Note: Julie Walters' two mentions in 2010, count as two separate nominations.

References

1955 establishments in the United Kingdom
Awards established in 1955
Actress
 
Television awards for Best Actress